Burnside is a suburb in Melbourne, Victoria, Australia,  west of Melbourne's Central Business District, located within the City of Melton local government area. Burnside recorded a population of 5,800 at the 2021 census.

Attractions

 Burnside Shopping Centre
 Kororoit Creek

Burnside is located beside the upper end of the Kororoit Creek, which still has populations of native reptiles, including Tiger snake, Eastern Blue-tongued Lizard, Common snakeneck turtle and Eastern brown snake.

Kororoit Creek is also home to the Eastern Banjo Frog, Common Eastern Froglet and the endangered Growling Grass Frog and Striped Legless Lizard.

See also
 Kororoit Creek Trail

References

Suburbs of Melbourne
Suburbs of the City of Melton